"Peer Pressure" is the first single from Mobb Deep's debut album Juvenile Hell. It was released under the 4th & Broadway label. The b-side features the song "Flavor for the Non-Believes".  On Prodigy's first verse, he stated that he "dreamed of being an architect" before taking up hip hop.

Track listing
Side A
"Peer Pressure"
"Peer Pressure" [Instrumental]

Side B
"Flavor for the Non-Believes" [Vocals]
"Flavor for the Non-Believes" [Instrumental]
"Flavor for the Non-Believes" [Clean version]

1992 songs
Mobb Deep songs
Song recordings produced by DJ Premier
1992 debut singles
4th & B'way Records singles
Songs written by Havoc (musician)
Songs written by Prodigy (rapper)